Contemporary romance is a subgenre of romance novels, generally set contemporaneously with the time of its writing. The largest of the romance novel subgenres, contemporary romance novels usually reflect the mores of their time.  Heroines in the contemporary romances written prior to 1970 usually quit working when they married or had children, while those novels written after 1970 usually have, and keep, a career.  As contemporary romance novels have grown to contain more complex plotting and more realistic characters, the line between this subgenre and the genre of women's fiction has blurred.

Most contemporary romance novels contain elements that date the books, and the majority of them eventually become irrelevant to more modern readers and go out of print.   Those that survive the test of time, such as the works of Jane Austen are often reclassified as historical romances.  In a 2014 survey of romance readers, contemporary romance made up 41% of print and 44% of ebook sales compared to other romance subgenres.

Subgenres
Contemporary romance novels may, in turn, be categorized into several subgenres, sometimes mixing with other main subgenres of romance novels.

Subgenres include:
 General contemporary romance
 Contemporary romantic suspense
 Baby love
 Medical romance
 Cowboy contemporary romance
 Glamour and jet set
 Humorous contemporary romance
 International lovers
 Love in the workplace
 Vacation love
 Lesbian romance
 Amnesia, that is memory loss, often including some former relationship
 "Bonkbusters", a subgenre of commercial romance novels from the 1970s and 1980s.

Baby love
This subgenre includes pregnancy, babies or children. One obstacle for making plots in this sense is to adapt to an ongoing increase in women who independently raise their children without any partner.

Nobody's Baby But Mine by Susan Elizabeth Phillips is an example of this subgenre.

Medical romance
Medical romance novels may generally be regarded as a subcategory of contemporary romance, as well as of medical fiction, but has its own type of setting and characters, although it yet can be as multifarious as any other subgenre. The setting usually involves a medical workplace, often the emergency department, but also airborne medicine, family medicine and obstetrics and gynaecology.

Regarding characters, the central male protagonists (heroes) are almost always medical doctors, mostly emergency physicians, primary care physicians or surgeons, and sometimes obstetricians/neonatologists or pediatricians. The female protagonists (heroines) are mostly medical doctors but also often nurses, working in primary care, obstetrics/neonatology, training or residency programs, surgery, anesthesiology or emergency medicine. The doctors are almost always ingenious, the men usually tallish, husky and chiseled, while nurses are strong but caring.

Patients bring a lot of potential for subplots. They mostly get completely recovered, regardless of the severity of their injury or disease. Almost no plot, however, includes a doctor-patient or nurse-patient relationship, since it is a code for professional health care workers to avoid intimate relationships with patients, as a part of a professional doctor-patient relationship.

The plot often includes pregnancy and children.

Lesbian romance
This subgenre is an important part of literature and has been prevalent since the mid 1700s . The lesbian romance genre is often a subgenre of broader genres such as BDSM romance, paranormal romance, coming-of-age romance, fantasy romance, and inspirational romance.

Critical Reception

Contemporary romance novels have twice been chosen by Kelly Ripa to be featured in her Reading with Ripa book club.

See also

Romance novel

References

Fiction by genre
Literary genres
Romance genres
Contemporary literature

fr:Sous-genres de la romance#Romance contemporaine